Jan Kowalski is a Polish-language term for "Average Joe". It is also a plausible name, and notable people with this name include:
 Maria Michał Kowalski (1871–1942), Polish Roman Catholic priest and schismatic religious leader
 Jan Kowalski (footballer) (born 1937), Polish football midfielder and manager
 Tadeusz Jan Kowalski (1889–1948), Polish orientalist, expert on Middle East Muslim culture and languages
 Jan Kowalski (pilot) (1916–2000), Polish World War II pilot
 (born 1945), Polish professor of technical sciences, chemical engineer and mechanic engineer